The Sarah Jane Adventures is a British science fiction television programme that was produced by BBC Cymru Wales for CBBC. Created by Russell T Davies, it is a spin-off of the long-running science fiction programme Doctor Who. 53 episodes and 1 short were produced between 2006 and 2011 across five series. In comparison to Doctor Who'''s family-orientated viewership, The Sarah Jane Adventures is aimed at a younger audience generally aged between 6–12 years old.

The programme focuses on Sarah Jane Smith (Elisabeth Sladen), an investigative journalist and former companion to the Doctor, an alien time traveller whom Smith had numerous adventures with in her youth. Now living in modern-day Ealing, London, she investigates extraterrestrial matters and protects Earth against alien threats with a group of teenage accomplices: her adopted son Luke Smith, neighbour Maria Jackson and friend Clyde Langer. New neighbour Rani Chandra and adopted daughter Sky Smith later join the cast. Additionally, the group is aided by Mr Smith, a sentient extraterrestrial computer, and K9, a dog-shaped robot gifted to Sarah Jane by the Doctor.

Following an introductory episode broadcast as a New Year's Day special, a first series of 10 episodes (5 two-part serials) premiered on 24 September 2007. Series 2–4, each comprising 12 episodes (6 serials), followed annually in between 2008 and 2010. A fifth series of 12 episodes was commissioned in 2010, but only 6 (3 serials) were completed before Sladen's death. They were posthumously broadcast in 2011. 

For Series 1 and 2, after an episode was broadcast on BBC One, the next would air immediately after on CBBC. Certain repeats are broadcast in omnibus rather than the traditional Part One and Two format.

Series overview

Episodes

Series 1 (2007)

Series 2 (2008)

Series 3 (2009)

Series 4 (2010)

Series 5 (2011)

Ratings

See also
 List of unmade The Sarah Jane Adventures episodes
 The Sarah Jane Adventures episode citations
 List of Doctor Who episodes (1963–1989)
 List of Doctor Who episodes (2005–present)
 K-9 and Company List of Torchwood episodes
 List of K-9 episodes
 List of Class episodes
 Sarah Jane's Alien Files''

Notes

References

External links
The Sarah Jane Adventures Scripts

 
Episodes
Sarah Jane Adventures
Sarah Jane Adventures
Sarah Jane Adventures

simple:The Sarah Jane Adventures#Episodes